Non-separable wavelets are multi-dimensional wavelets that are not directly implemented as tensor products of wavelets on some lower-dimensional space.
They have been studied since 1992.
They offer a few important advantages. Notably, using non-separable filters leads to more parameters in design, and consequently better filters.
The main difference, when compared to the one-dimensional wavelets, is that multi-dimensional sampling requires the use of lattices (e.g., the quincunx lattice).
The wavelet filters themselves can be separable or non-separable regardless of the sampling lattice.
Thus, in some cases, the non-separable wavelets can be implemented in a separable fashion.
Unlike separable wavelet, the non-separable wavelets are capable of detecting structures that are not only horizontal, vertical or diagonal (show less anisotropy).

Examples 
 Red-black wavelets
 Contourlets
 Shearlets
 Directionlets
 Steerable pyramids
 Non-separable schemes for tensor-product wavelets

References 

Wavelets
Multidimensional signal processing
Image processing